Russell Charles Young (September 15, 1902 – May 13, 1984) was a professional baseball catcher. He played part of one season in Major League Baseball for the St. Louis Browns in 1931. He was a switch hitter and threw right-handed. He was 6'0" and weighed 175 lbs. Young also played 4 games at fullback for the Dayton Triangles of the National Football League in 1925.

Young had an extensive career in minor league baseball, spanning eighteen seasons from 1923-40. He played most of his career with the minor league Milwaukee Brewers, for whom he played in all but two seasons from 1923-34.

References

http://www.pro-football-reference.com/players/Y/YounRu20.htm

American football fullbacks
Dayton Triangles players
Major League Baseball catchers
St. Louis Browns players
Milwaukee Brewers (minor league) players
Minneapolis Millers (baseball) players
Charleston Senators players
Union City Greyhounds players
Huntington Aces players
Baseball players from Ohio
People from Bryan, Ohio
1902 births
1984 deaths
Sportspeople from Roseville, California